The Dubois Museum is a  museum preserving and interpreting the history of the Upper Wind River Valley and is located in the town of Dubois, Wyoming on U.S. Route 26 along the Wyoming Centennial Scenic Byway. The museum offers interpretive programs, exhibits, multi-media presentations, and special events.

Exhibits
The center contains several permanent exhibits.

 The Natural History of the Upper Wind River Valley featuring displays including the geology of the Wind River including the Chugwater Formation, gastroliths, Turritella agates, and the flora and fauna including the native cutthroat trout and bighorn sheep
 The Mountain Shoshone, known as the Sheepeaters, and how they lived as interpreted from the steatite tools, horn bows crafted from bighorn sheep horn, and petroglyphs left from ancestors  
 The Charlie Moore Collection presenting artifacts of the CM Ranch, the oldest continuously operating guest ranch in Wyoming. 
 the Scandinavian loggers (tie hacks) who cut railroad ties for the nation's railroads in the national forests near Dubois as presented in the Wind River Tie-Hack Gallery  
 The US Cavalry in Wyoming 
 The homesteaders who settled in the late 1800s

Educational tours are also offered to area geological, archaeological, and historical sites of Sheepeater bighorn sheep traps, Plains Indians teepee rings, petroglyphs, and cabins from the “tie hack” era.

See also
 CM Ranch and Simpson Lake Cabins
 National Bighorn Sheep Interpretive Center
 List of Registered Historic Places in Wyoming

References

External links
Dubois Museum - official site

Dubois, Wyoming
Museums in Fremont County, Wyoming
Natural history museums in Wyoming
American West museums in Wyoming